Le Grand Journal was a Canadian news television program, which aired on the TQS network in Quebec from 1986 to 2008. The program was anchored by Jean-Luc Mongrain. The program was cancelled in 2008, prior to the network's rebranding as V in 2009.

References

1980s Canadian television news shows
1990s Canadian television news shows
2000s Canadian television news shows
1986 Canadian television series debuts
2008 Canadian television series endings
Television shows filmed in Montreal
Noovo original programming